Calliope is a New York City-based band which plays Renaissance music and modern music using early musical instruments, such as the sackbut, shawm, viol, and the hurdy-gurdy.

Calliope won the Naumburg Chamber Music Award in 1975. The band performed at the 1977 U.S. Presidential inauguration and later contributed to the soundtrack for R O Blechman's 1978 PBS holiday special Simple Gifts.

The band released three albums: Calliope Dances: A Renaissance Revel (Nonesuch, 1982); Calliope Festival (Nonesuch, 1984); and Diversions (Summit, 1990). The band recorded Peter Schickele's composition Bestiary in 1984.

Members
 Lucy Bardo – viola, vielle, rebec
 Lawrence Benz – sackbut, lute, recorder, crumhorn
 Allan Dean – cornetto, sackbut, recorder, crumhorn
 Ben Harms – viol, pipe, tabor, recorder, crumhorn, percussion

References

Instrumental early music groups
Musical groups from New York City
Sackbut players
American performers of early music
Classical musicians from New York (state)
Summit Records artists
Nonesuch Records artists